Rakel Bjork Karvelsson (Icelandic name: Rakel Björk Ögmundsdóttir; born 4 January 1977) is an Icelandic-American former professional football player. She made 10 appearances for the Iceland women's national football team, scoring seven goals. In the 2001 season she played for the Philadelphia Charge of the Women's United Soccer Association, having previously played for Breiðablik.

She was named Icelandic Women's Footballer of the Year in 2000. She suffered an anterior cruciate ligament injury while in training for the 2002 season.

While playing college soccer for the University of North Carolina at Chapel Hill from 1995 to 1998, Karvelsson gained a reputation as a super sub. She started just eight of her 102 appearances for the "Tar Heels", but contributed 40 goals and 33 assists.

Notes

References

External links

North Carolina Tar Heels – Rakel Karvelsson

1977 births
Living people
Rakel Karvelsson
Rakel Karvelsson
Women's association football midfielders
Rakel Karvelsson
Women's United Soccer Association players
Philadelphia Charge players
American people of Icelandic descent
Soccer players from Georgia (U.S. state)
North Carolina Tar Heels women's soccer players
American women's soccer players